The following is a list of episodes for the Australian television programme Rush on Network Ten.

Series overview 
<onlyinclude>

Episodes

Series 1 (2008)

Series 2 (2009)

Series 3 (2010)

Series 4 (2011)
On 12 November 2010, Network Ten renewed Rush for a 13 episode, fourth series to air from 1 September 2011.

Ratings

References

External links 
 
 

Lists of Australian drama television series episodes
Lists of crime television series episodes